Speechless is an American television sitcom that debuted on September 21, 2016, on ABC. On September 29, 2016, ABC ordered a full season of 22 episodes. On December 13, 2016, an additional episode was added bringing the season to a total of 23 episodes. On May 12, 2017, ABC renewed the series for a second season, which premiered on September 27, 2017. On May 11, 2018, ABC renewed the series for a third season. The series finale aired on April 12, 2019.

On May 10, 2019, ABC cancelled the series after three seasons.

Series overview

Episodes

Season 1 (2016–17)

Season 2 (2017–18)

Season 3 (2018–19)

Ratings

Season 1

Season 2

Season 3

References

General references

External links
 
 

Lists of American sitcom episodes